MGL Realisations (2022) Limited (trading as Missguided) is a UK-based multichannel retailer selling clothes aimed at women aged 16-35 years old. 

Missguided's headquarters were in Stretford, Greater Manchester until 2015  when they moved to Trafford Park. Missguided launched a menswear brand called Mennace in 2017.

History 
Missguided was established in 2009 by Nitin Passi. Since its launch, the online retailer has experienced rapid growth in the UK  and has expanded into the US, Australia, France and Germany.

In March 2015, Missguided launched in US department store Nordstrom, followed by a concession at Selfridges Trafford Centre in June.  In November, the second UK bricks-and-mortar store was opened within Selfridges Manchester Exchange Square and the third was opened in Selfridges in Birmingham in March 2016.

In September 2017, Missguided announced the launch of the menswear label Mennace.

In December 2021, investment firm Alteri Investors acquired a 50% stake in Missguided.

In May 2022 it was reported Missguided were on the 'brink of collapse' after being issued with a winding up petition by its suppliers who were owed millions of pounds.

On 31 May 2022 it was reported that Missguided had gone into administration after being unable to pay its debts. The next day, on 1 June 2022, it was announced that Frasers Group had bought the intellectual property of Missguided and its sister brand Mennace for around £20 million. It is estimated that 87 staff members will be made redundant and 147 will be moved to Frasers Group, with the legal name changed to MGL Realisations (2022) Limited in July 2022. Frasers Group later bought fashion company I Saw It First. Greg Pateras, former Matalan CEO, was appointed CEO of both companies in August 2022.

In March 2023, Missguided began to tease their rebranding on their Instagram page, revealing a brand new logo. On 14th March, Missguided revealed the date of their relaunch is 31st March 2023.

Products 
In September 2015, the company introduced tall and petite lines which each featured around 70 pieces, following its plus-size collection in November 2014.  For Winter 2015, the company launched a range of collections including lingerie, nightwear, a denim collection as well as a premium collection called Peace & Love.

In May 2016, Missguided launched a range of wedding dresses.  The collection was made up of 19 pieces for brides and bridesmaids.

Collaborations 

In March 2014, Missguided marked its fifth birthday with a collaboration with singer Nicole Scherzinger. The 40-piece collection was designed by Scherzinger.
May 2015 saw a collaboration between Missguided and R&B singer Pia Mia.

In March 2016, the womenswear label announced that Pamela Anderson would front their SS16 collection. The campaign was shot by Swedish photographer Arvida Byström, from a concept created by creative director and stylist Soki Mak.

A Bikini A Day bloggers Tash Oakley and Devin Brugman collaborated with Missguided in May 2016 to launch a new swimwear line.

In September 2016, the company announced a campaign collaboration with American model and singer Amber Rose. The company also launched collections with bloggers including Carli Bybel, Caroline Receveur, Sarah Ashcroft and Alexis Ren. November 2016 saw Missguided launch its first flagship store in Westfield Stratford, London.

In 2017, Missguided launched a collection with British supermodel Jourdan Dunn.  In the same year Missguided was involved in a campaign by Lucozade Zero.

In 2019, Playboy x Missguided was re-launched, after first debuting in 2018. The collection was met with mixed reviews, due to the ambiguous reputation of Playboy Magazine, and the design choices made in the collaboration 

In the same year, the collection 'SofiaRichie x Missguided', produced in collaboration with model Sofia Richie was also launched on the official Missguided website. The model announced the collaboration across all of her social media accounts, in coordination with the brand's social channels.

References 

Retail companies of the United Kingdom
Clothing retailers of the United Kingdom
Retail companies established in 2009
British companies established in 2009
Companies that filed for Chapter 11 bankruptcy in 2022
2022 mergers and acquisitions